Aremberg Castle is a ruined mediaeval hill castle on the  Aremberg in the Ahr Hills in the Eifel region in Germany. The ruins lie near Aremberg in the county of Ahrweiler in the German state of Rhineland-Palatinate.

Location 
The castle ruins lie on the thickly wooded mountain of Aremberg one of the largest Tertiary volcanoes in the Eifel, in the vicinity of the settlement of Aremberg. The village itself is on the western mountainside, below the summit dome.

Castle site 
The castle is first mentioned in 1166, then under the name of Arberg. In the 12th century, a castle was built on the mountain because it was a good strategic location.

Aremberg Castle was the heart of the eponymous, imperially immediate Barony of Arenberg, whose family still flourishes today in Belgium and South America and has a large fortune. Although the barony was very small in area, many members of the family managed to exercise great influence at the court of Vienna, so that the family was elevated from counts to princes and finally to dukes. The present, sparse remains of the castle hardly reflect anything of the family's status.

Following the family's rise up the social strata, the castle complex was expanded over a period of 18 years into a fortress of huge proportions that covered the entire Aremberg around 1670. It was so powerful that the troops of Louis XIV  did not dare to attack it because it was considered to be impregnable. The Duke dismissed his garrison troops in 1679 after the Treaty of Nijmegen, a moved which proved fatal. Three years later, the castle was taken almost undefended by French troops. The French planned to extend the fortress and use it themselves. But a serious accident occurred when an incorrectly planned detonation altered the water supply in the area significantly. As a result, all the wells of the castle dried up. For this reason, its occupiers left the castle after just one year. The fortress itself was then blown up and rendered useless.

Schloss 
Around 1720 the castle was rebuilt by the dukes and turned into a schloss. On 13 October 1794 came the next setback. As a foretaste of the antics of French revolutionary troops, a French soldier demanded that his general, a commissioner and several officers be accommodated in the castle. As a result, the duke and his family moved their estate to the Netherlands. Finally, in 1803, Jean Gaspard Villmart bought the "castle on the Aremberg" and had it demolished in 1809. Remains from all periods of construction are preserved, such as the moat and bank, bastions of the fortress as well as twelve lime trees in the old castle garden.

Viewing tower 
A few years after the demolition, Gottfried Kinkel visited the field of ruins and this sight, together with the abject poverty of the Aremberg villagers filled him with anguish because the once flourishing settlement had become a poor village. He later reported this in his book Die Ahr (1846). In 1854, on the former castle grounds an approximately 17-metre-high viewing tower was built, which stands near a point on the mountain . It was built from the stone of the former castle complex. Due to the growth of trees, it has not been used as a lookout tower for decades. Likewise, the museum that used to be in it no longer exists. Today, the tower is locked.

References

Literature

External links 

 Burg Aremberg, at eifel.de
 Burg Arenberg (Burg Aremberg; at the Arenberg Stiftung), artist's impression at arenbergfoundation.eu
 Burg Aremberg, at nordeifel.de
 Die Burg Aremberg (short description, drawings and old photos), at bilder.kreis-ahrweiler.de
 

12th-century architecture
Aremberg
Heritage sites in Rhineland-Palatinate
Castles in Rhineland-Palatinate
Ahrweiler (district)
Demolished buildings and structures in Germany
Buildings and structures demolished in 1809